The following is a timeline of major events leading up to the United States presidential election of 2012. The election was the 57th quadrennial United States presidential election and was held on November 6, 2012.

2009

October
October 12 – Secretary of State and 2008 presidential challenger Hillary Clinton declares she will not challenge President Barack Obama in the 2012 election campaign.

2010

January
January 21 – In a 5–4 decision, the Supreme Court rules in Citizens United v. Federal Election Commission that corporate funding of independent political broadcasts in candidate elections cannot be limited.

November
November 2 – Midterm Elections.  The Republican Party made historic gains (63 seats) in the United States House of Representatives and gained 6 seats in the United States Senate.  They also gained six gubernatorial seats, as well as historic gains in state legislatures

December
The 2010 Census changes the Electoral College vote apportionment for the election for 18 states.
December 23 – Jimmy McMillan, perennial candidate from New York changes party affiliation from Democratic to Republican and officially announces his candidacy for the  presidential nomination of the Republican Party

2011

January
January 6 – Stewart Alexander, activist and 2008 Socialist Party USA vice-presidential nominee, officially announces his candidacy for the presidential nomination of the Peace and Freedom Party.
January 12 – Herman Cain, radio host, businessman and former Senate candidate from Georgia, announces the formation of a formal exploratory committee in preparation for a possible run for the presidential nomination of the Republican Party.
January 18 – Randall Terry, an anti-abortion activist from New York and former Republican, officially announces his candidacy for the presidential nomination of the Democratic Party
January 22 – The New Hampshire Straw Poll is won by Mitt Romney with 35% of the vote.

February
February 8 – Andy Martin, perennial candidate and birther movement activist from Illinois, formally filed papers with the Federal Election Commission to run for the presidential nomination of the Republican Party
February 12–Conservative Political Action Conference; Ron Paul wins straw poll.
February 28 – The Tea Party Patriots straw poll is won by Ron Paul, U.S. Representative of Texas.

March
March 3 – Newt Gingrich, former Speaker of the House of Representatives, announces the formation of an informal exploratory committee in preparation for a potential run for the presidential nomination of the Republican Party.

Buddy Roemer, former Governor of Louisiana, announces the formation of an exploratory committee in preparation for a potential run the presidential nomination of the Republican Party
March 16 – Secretary of State Hillary Clinton expands on her previous statement to also specify that she will not serve as vice-president or a second term as Secretary of State
March 21 – Tim Pawlenty, former Governor of Minnesota, announces the formation of an exploratory committee in preparation for a potential run for the presidential nomination of the Republican Party; Fred Karger announces he will run for president.
March 23 – Fred Karger officially announces his candidacy for the presidential nomination of the Republican Party.

April
April 4 – President Barack Obama files papers with the Federal Election Commission and announces his candidacy for a second presidential nomination of the Democratic Party, and re-election to a second term as President
April 11 – Mitt Romney, former Governor of Massachusetts, announces the formation of a formal exploratory committee in preparation of a potential run for the presidential nomination of the Republican Party; The St. Anselm College Republican Straw Poll in Goffstown, New Hampshire is won by Fred Karger with 25% of the vote, followed closely by Romney with 23%
April 13 – Rick Santorum, former Senator from Pennsylvania, announces the formation of a formal exploratory committee in preparation of a potential run for the presidential nomination of the Republican Party
April 18 – Roy Moore, Chief Justice of the Alabama Supreme Court, announces the formation of a formal exploratory committee in preparation for a potential run for the presidential nomination of the Republican Party
April 21 – Gary Johnson, former Governor of New Mexico, officially announces his candidacy for the presidential nomination of the Republican Party
April 26 – Ron Paul announced the formation of a formal exploratory committee in preparation for a run for the presidential nomination of the Republican Party

May
May 3 – Jon Huntsman, former U.S. Ambassador to China, filed papers to create a federal political action committee
May 5 – The first Republican debate takes place in South Carolina with Cain, Johnson, Pawlenty, Paul, and Santorum  participating
May 11 – Newt Gingrich officially announces his candidacy for the presidential nomination of the Republican Party
May 13 – Ron Paul officially announces his candidacy for the presidential nomination of the Republican Party
May 14 – Former Arkansas Governor and 2008 candidate Mike Huckabee announces he will not run for president in 2012
May 16 – Businessman Donald Trump announces he will not run for president in 2012
May 21 – Herman Cain officially announces his candidacy for the presidential nomination of the Republican Party
May 22 – Indiana Governor Mitch Daniels announces he will not run for president in 2012.
May 23 – Former Minnesota Governor Tim Pawlenty officially announces his candidacy for the presidential nomination of the Republican Party

June
June 2 – Mitt Romney officially announces his candidacy for the presidential nomination of the Republican Party
June 6 – Rick Santorum officially announces his candidacy for the presidential nomination of the Republican Party
June 13 – CNN and the New Hampshire Union Leader hosts a Republican debate in Goffstown, New Hampshire
June 14 – Michele Bachmann, U.S. Representative of Minnesota, announces during the debate that she has filed papers with the Federal Election Commission for a run for the presidential nomination of the Republican Party
June 18 – Results of the Southern Republican Leadership Conference straw poll: Ron Paul 612; Jon Huntsman 382; Michele Bachmann 191; Herman Cain  104; Mitt Romney  74; Newt Gingrich  69; Sarah Palin 41; Rick Santorum 30; Tim Pawlenty  18; Gary Johnson  10; Buddy Roemer  9; Thad McCotter  2
June 21 – Jon Huntsman officially announces his candidacy for the presidential nomination of the Republican Party
June 22 – Retired engineer and perennial candidate Jack Fellure wins the presidential nomination of the Prohibition Party at the Party's national convention in Cullman, Alabama
June 27 – Michele Bachmann officially announces her candidacy for the presidential nomination of the Republican Party

July
July 1 – Thaddeus McCotter, U.S. Representative of Michigan, announces he has filed papers with the Federal Election Commission to campaign for the presidential nomination of the Republican Party
July 2 – Thaddeus McCotter officially announces his candidacy for the presidential nomination of the Republican Party.
July 21 – Buddy Roemer officially announces his candidacy for the presidential nomination of the Republican Party

August
August 12 – Republican candidates debate is held in Iowa. Bachmann, Cain, Gingrich, Huntsman, Paul, Pawlenty, Romney, and Santorum are the participants
August 13 – Michele Bachmann wins the Ames straw poll in Iowa.
August 13 – Texas Governor Rick Perry officially announces his candidacy for the presidential nomination of the Republican Party.
August 14 – Former Minnesota Governor  Tim Pawlenty announces his withdrawal from the race for the Republican presidential nomination

September
September 6 – John Bolton, former U.S. Ambassador to the United Nations, announces that he will not run for president in 2012
September 7 – Republican candidates debate is held in Simi Valley, California. Bachmann, Cain, Gingrich, Huntsman, Perry, Paul, Romney, and Santorum are the participants
September 12 – Republican candidates debate is held in Tampa, Florida. Bachmann, Cain, Gingrich, Huntsman, Perry, Paul, Romney, and Santorum are the participants
September 14 -Arizona Governor Jan Brewer issues an official proclamation that the Arizona primary shall be held on February 28
September 19 -Ralph Nader and others announce a coalition to find a Primary challenger for Obama.
September 22 – U.S. Representative Thaddeus McCotter announces his withdrawal from the race for the Republican presidential nomination
September 22 – Republican candidates debate is held in Orlando, Florida. Sponsors: Fox News, Google and Florida Republican Party. Participants: Bachmann, Cain, Gingrich, Huntsman, Johnson, Perry, Paul, Romney, and Santorum
September 26 – Herman Cain wins Florida 5 straw poll.

October
October 4—Chris Christie, Governor of New Jersey, responding to mounting speculation that he would make a late entry in the Republican presidential nomination race, announces he will not run for president in 2012
October 5—Sarah Palin, former Governor of Alaska and 2008 Republican Party nominee for vice president, announces that she will not run for president in 2012
October 11— Rudy Giuliani, Former Mayor of New York City and 2008 candidate, announces that he will not run for president in 2012
October 11— Republican candidates debate on Bloomberg Television at Dartmouth College in Hanover, New Hampshire. Sponsored by Bloomberg, The Washington Post and WBIN-TV.
October 12—   Michele Bachmann, Herman Cain, Newt Gingrich, Gary Johnson, and Rick Santorum, all address the New Hampshire House of Representatives
October 14–16 – Socialist Party USA convention in Los Angeles, CA selects Stewart Alexander as their presidential candidate and Alejandro Mendoza as their vice-presidential candidate
October 18— Republican candidates debate on CNN in Las Vegas, Nevada. Sponsored by CNN and the Western Republican Leadership Conference.

November
November 5— Herman Cain wins Sioux Falls Straw Poll
November 9— Republican candidates debate on CNBC at Oakland University in Rochester, MI. Sponsored by CNBC and the Michigan Republican Party
November 22- Republican candidates debate on CNN in Washington, D.C.

December
December 3— Herman Cain announces the suspension of his campaign for the Republican Party presidential nomination
December 3 – Green Party presidential candidates debate in Los Angeles, California
December 7— Gingrich wins Delaware state committee straw poll
December 10— Republican candidates debate in Des Moines, Iowa at Drake University. Sponsored by ABC News and Republican Party of Iowa
December 15— Republican presidential debate in Sioux City, Iowa, hosted by Fox News
December 19
- Republican presidential candidates debate in Goffstown, New Hampshire, Sponsored by Saint Anselm College None of the candidates listed on the ballot in the Iowa Caucus attend.
— Democratic candidates debate in Goffstown, New Hampshire, Sponsored by Saint Anselm College President Obama does not participate
December 19—  Gingrich narrowly wins Tea Party Patriots straw poll over Michele Bachmann
December 28— Former New Mexico Governor Gary Johnson ends his bid for the Republican presidential nomination, and enters the race of the Libertarian Party's presidential nomination

2012

January
January 3 – The Iowa Republican caucuses are initially declared as a victory for Mitt Romney. However, later counts show Rick Santorum with a small lead in the popular vote. Later, Ron Paul picks up a majority of delegates at the state's convention. The Iowa Democratic caucuses are won by Barack Obama.  Neither caucus awards any delegates, but are to be used as a guide for delegate selection in June's party conventions
January 4 – Representative Michele Bachmann announces the suspension of her presidential campaign
January 7 – Republican debate in Goffstown, New Hampshire, sponsored by ABC News and WMUR
January 8 – Republican debate at the Chubb Theatre at the Capitol Center for the Arts in Concord, New Hampshire, sponsored by NBC News, Facebook, and The Union Leader
January 10 – The New Hampshire Republican primary is won by Mitt Romney and New Hampshire Democratic primary by Barack Obama
January 16 – Jon Huntsman withdraws from the race and endorses Mitt Romney
January 16 – Recount in Iowa shows that Rick Santorum won the Republican caucuses
January 16 – Republican debates at the Myrtle Beach Convention Center in Myrtle Beach, South Carolina, sponsored by Fox News and the Republican Party of South Carolina
January 19 – Rick Perry withdraws from the race and endorses Newt Gingrich
January 19 – Republican debate in Charleston, South Carolina, sponsored by CNN and the Southern Republican Leadership Conference
January 21 — The Nevada Democratic Caucuses are won by Barack Obama
January 21 – The South Carolina Republican primary is won by Newt Gingrich
January 23 – Republican debate at the University of South Florida in Tampa, Florida, sponsored by St. Petersburg Times, NBC News, the National Journal and the Florida Council of 100
January 26 – Republican debate in Jacksonville, Florida, sponsored by CNN and the Republican Party of Florida
January 28 – The South Carolina Democratic primary is won by Barack Obama
January 31 – The Florida Republican primary is won by Mitt Romney. The Florida Democratic primary is won by Barack Obama

February
February 2 – Roseanne Barr, actress, announces her candidacy for the Green Party presidential nomination
February 4 – Nevada Republican caucuses are won by Mitt Romney
February 4 – Voting began in the Maine Republican caucuses: Paul gaining 21 delegates, and Romney 3
February 7 – The Minnesota Republican caucuses are won by Rick Santorum
February 7 – The Missouri Democratic Primary and Minnesota caucuses are won by Barack Obama. The Missouri Republican Primary is won by Rick Santorum, although the contest does not affect how Missouri's GOP delegates are awarded
February 7 – The Colorado Republican caucuses are won by Rick Santorum
February 11 – Voting concludes in the Maine Republican caucuses, Mitt Romney is declared the winner
February 22 – Republican candidates debate on CNN in Phoenix, Arizona
February 28 – Arizona Republican Primary won by Mitt Romney
February 28 – Michigan Republican Primary won by Mitt Romney
February 29 – Wyoming caucuses won by Mitt Romney

March
March 3 – Washington state Republican caucuses – won by Mitt Romney
March 6 –  (Super Tuesday) – Romney wins six states; Santorum, three states; Gingrich wins Georgia
March 6 –  Alaska Republican district conventions – won by Mitt Romney
March 6 –  Colorado Republican caucuses – won by Santorum
March 6 –  Georgia Republican primary – won by Newt Gingrich
March 6 –  Idaho Republican caucuses – won by Mitt Romney
March 6 –  North Dakota Republican caucuses – won by Rick Santorum
March 6 –  Massachusetts primary – won by Mitt Romney
March 6 –  Minnesota Republican caucuses – won by Rick Santorum
March 6 –  Ohio Republican primary – won by Mitt Romney
March 6 –  Oklahoma Republican primary – won by Rick Santorum
March 6 –  Tennessee primary – won by Rick Santorum
March 6 –  Vermont Republican primary – won by Mitt Romney
March 6 –  Virginia Republican primary – won by Mitt Romney
March 10  –  Kansas Republican caucuses are won by Rick Santorum
March 10  –  Virgin Islands Republican caucuses are won by Ron Paul, but most of the delegates were awarded to Mitt Romney
March 11  –  Maine Democratic caucuses – won by Barack Obama
March 13  –  Alabama Republican primary; Hawaii, and American Samoa Republican caucuses; Mississippi Democratic and Republican Primaries; Utah Democratic caucuses
March 17  –  Missouri Republican caucuses (52 delegates)
March 18  –  Puerto Rico Republican caucuses – won by Romney
March 20  –  Mitt Romney wins the Illinois primaries
March 24  –  Louisiana primaries – won by Rick Santorum
March 31  –  Arizona Democratic caucuses – won by Barack Obama

April
April 3 – Maryland, Wisconsin, Washington DC primaries – won by Mitt Romney and Barack Obama, the latter of whom won enough delegates to clinch the Democratic nomination.
April 10 – Former US Senator Rick Santorum suspends his campaign for the Republican presidential nomination
April 14 – Idaho Democratic caucuses, Kansas Democratic caucuses, Nebraska Democratic caucuses, Wyoming Democratic caucuses
April 15 – Alaska Democratic caucuses, Washington Democratic caucuses
April 18–21 – 2012 Constitution Party National Convention held in Nashville, Tennessee
April 21 – Former US Congressman Virgil Goode wins the presidential nomination of the Constitution Party
April 24 – Connecticut, Delaware, New York, Pennsylvania, Rhode Island primaries – won by Mitt Romney
April 25 – Republican National Committee declares Mitt Romney the presumptive nominee of the party

May
May 2 – Former Speaker of the House of Representatives Newt Gingrich suspended his candidacy for the Republican presidential nomination and endorsed Mitt Romney
May 4–6 – The 2012 Libertarian National Convention held in Las Vegas, Nevada Ron Paul wins the majority of delegates in Nevada and Maine.
May 5 – Former Governor of New Mexico Gary Johnson wins the presidential nomination of the Libertarian Party
May 5 – Michigan Democratic caucuses, Florida Democratic caucuses
May 8 – Indiana, North Carolina, West Virginia primaries
May 15 – Nebraska, and Oregon primaries
May 22 – Arkansas, and Kentucky primaries
May 29 – Texas primaries
May 31 – Buddy Roemer ends his presidential campaign

June
June 3 – Puerto Rico Democratic caucuses
June 5 – California, Montana, New Jersey, New Mexico, South Dakota primaries; North Dakota Democratic caucuses
June 26 – Utah primaries
June 29 – Political consultant Fred Karger suspends his presidential campaign

July
July 12–15 – Jill Stein wins the presidential nomination of the Green Party at the party's nominating convention held in Baltimore, Maryland. Cheri Honkala is the party's vice-presidential nominee

August
August 11 – Paul Ryan, house budget chairman, is announced as Mitt Romney's vice presidential candidate
August 27–30 – Romney and Ryan are nominated for president and vice president, respectively, at the 2012 Republican National Convention held in Tampa, Florida

September
September 3–6 – Obama and Biden are nominated for president and vice president, respectively, at the 2012 Democratic National Convention held in Charlotte, North Carolina
 September 22 – Early voting begins in 12 states

October

 October 3 — First presidential debate at University of Denver in Denver, Colorado
 October 11 — Vice presidential debate at Centre College in Danville, Kentucky
 October 16 — Second presidential debate at Hofstra University in Hempstead, New York
 October 22 — Third presidential debate at Lynn University in Boca Raton, Florida
 October 23 — Free and Equal Elections Foundation presidential debate at Hilton Chicago in Chicago, Illinois, moderated by Larry King
 October 25 — President Barack Obama casts early vote in Chicago
 October 29 – Hurricane Sandy pummels the East Coast, putting the campaign on hold for a few days

November
 November 4 – Early voting ends 
 November 5–  Second Free and Equal Elections Foundation debate, moderated by Christina Tobin and Thom Hartmann
 November 6 – Election Day: President Barack Obama is reelected with 51% of the popular vote

December
 December 17 – The electors meet in their respective state capitals (electors for the District of Columbia meet within the district) to formally vote for the president and vice president.

2013

January
 January 4  – Electoral votes formally counted before a joint session of Congress; the President of the Senate formally announces the electoral result. (Constitution mandates this to occur on Jan. 6; since that is a Sunday in 2013 Congress voted to change it to Jan. 4 )
 January 20 – Beginning of new presidential term. In the White House Blue Room, Chief Justice John Roberts administers the presidential oath to Barack Obama and at the Naval Observatory, Associate Justice Sonia Sotomayor administers the oath to Joe Biden.
 January 21 – Inauguration Day: Barack Obama is inaugurated for his second term as the 44th president of the United States and Joe Biden for his second term as the 47th vice president in Washington, D.C.

Election campaign 2012 candidate participation timeline 
Candidate announcement and, if applicable, withdrawal dates are as follows:

See also
 2004 United States presidential election timeline
 2008 United States presidential election timeline
 2016 United States presidential election timeline
 Democratic Party presidential primaries, 2012
 Republican Party presidential primaries, 2012

References

External links
2012 Presidential Form 2 Filers at the Federal Election Commission (FEC)

Timeline
2012
Articles which contain graphical timelines